Toytown may refer to

 Toytown, a BBC children's radio programme which later transferred to ITV
 Toytown (horse), equine partner of Zara Phillips
 Toytown Germany, an English-language community website for Germany
 English shopping web-site for children; budget U.S. children's resource site
 A nickname locals use for Poundbury, Prince Charles' model community
 Toytown, the fictional town in the animated television series, Make Way for Noddy
 Term of abuse for record label Motown, coined by the UK music press in the 1970s
  Toytown is a Happy Hardcore song by Hixxy and Sharkey from 1995
 Nickname used for Taunton mostly in the nightclub scene
 A large landfill in Saint Petersburg, Florida, USA

 Local Specialty Toy and Game Store with two locations Meridian, Idaho and Twin Falls, Idaho